John Erskine may refer to:
John Erskine of Dun (1509–1591), Superintendent of Angus and Mearns, Scotland, and Moderator of the General Assembly of the Church of Scotland
John Erskine (Scottish politician) (1660–1733), MP for Stirling Burghs
John Erskine of Cardross (1661–1743), Scottish soldier and politician
Sir John Erskine, 3rd Baronet (1672–1739), Scottish MP
John Erskine of Carnock (1695–1768), Scottish jurist
John Erskine (theologian), (1721–1803), leading member of the Evangelicals in the Church of Scotland
John Erskine (Royal Navy officer) (1806–1887), Royal Navy officer and British politician
John Erskine (judge) (1813–1895), United States federal judge
John Erskine (educator) (1879–1951), American educator and author
John MacLaren Erskine (1894–1917), British Army officer, and recipient of the Victoria Cross
John Erskine, Lord Erskine (1895–1953), Governor of Madras
John Erskine (music), music producer, see Bad Moon Rising (album)
John Erskine (ice hockey) (born 1980), professional ice hockey player
John Erskine, 1st Baron Erskine of Rerrick (1893–1980), Scottish banker
Jack Erskine (John Angus Erskine, 1873–1960), New Zealand educated physicist, electrical engineer, benefactor and chess master
John Erskine, 5th Lord Erskine (died 1552), Scottish nobleman

Earls of Mar
John Erskine, Earl of Mar (died 1572) 
John Erskine, Earl of Mar (1558–1634)  
John Erskine, Earl of Mar (1585–1654) 
John Erskine, Earl of Mar (d.1668) 
John Erskine, Earl of Mar (1675–1732) (forfeit 1716)
John Erskine, Earl of Mar (1741–1825) (restored 1824) 
John Erskine, Earl of Mar (1772–1828)
John Erskine, Earl of Mar (1795–1866)
John Goodeve-Erskine, Earl of Mar (1836–1930)
John Goodeve-Erskine, Earl of Mar (1868–1932)

See also
John Erskine Read (1888–1973), Canadian judge